The "Diana Theatre" is a 2,345-seat indoor theater in Guadalajara, Mexico.

History
Many international concerts have been held in the venue, some performers who have performed shows in the theater are, Morrissey,
Pink Floyd, Vienna Boys' Choir, High School Musical, Wisin & Yandel, Lila Downs and many more.

The theater opened in February 2005 with Lord of the Dance and Michael Flately being the first acts to perform in the venue with 8 shows and over 33,000 attendees.

See also
 Auditorio Telmex
 List of music venues in Mexico

References

External links

Categories
Music venues in Mexico
Buildings and structures in Guadalajara, Jalisco
Theatres completed in 2005